Sergiusia is a monotypic moth genus of the family Noctuidae described by Nye in 1980. Its only species, Sergiusia pentelia, was described by Herbert Druce in 1887. It is known from Mozambique.

References

Endemic fauna of Mozambique
Agaristinae
Lepidoptera of Mozambique
Owlet moths of Africa